The Edward D. Born House is a private house located at 158 Hill Street in Allegan, Michigan. It was added to the National Register of Historic Places in 1987.

History
Edward D. Born was the third son of Englebert B. Born, the founder of the Allegan Wagon and Carriage Factory. Edward Born constructed this house for his family in about 1890.

Description
The house is a simple two-story, L-shaped house covered with clapboard siding. It has a cross-gabled roof with one hipped portion. The front has a projecting two-story entryway with a Tuscan-columned porch.

References

National Register of Historic Places in Allegan County, Michigan
Houses on the National Register of Historic Places in Michigan
Houses completed in 1890